Herman Guy Kump (October 31, 1877February 14, 1962) was the 19th Governor of West Virginia from 1933 to 1937. In 1907, he married Edna Hall Scott. Usually referred to as H. Guy Kump, he served as the 19th Governor of West Virginia during the Great Depression.

Early years

Governor Kump was a graduate of the University of Virginia, and after completing his studies he started a law practice in Elkins, West Virginia.  Herman Guy Kump and his wife Edna reared six children. They were Cyrus, Frances, Margaret and Elizabeth (twins), Mary, and Benjamin.  H. G. Kump served as Prosecuting Attorney and Circuit Judge of Randolph County, was president of a local bank, and also was elected mayor of Elkins.  During World War I, he was a captain in the United States Army serving in the Judge Advocate General's office in Washington, D.C.

Legal career
For years, former Governor Kump had a respected law firm of Kump, Kump, and Nuzum with his eldest son, Cyrus Kump, and their law partner, Jack Robert Nuzum.  Cyrus Kump was active in community life and in 1952 attempted to be the Democratic nominee for Governor of West Virginia but was not successful in that bid. He was a notable lawyer in West Virginia and was instrumental with other community members in starting the West Virginia Highlanders Bagpipe Band. Cyrus Kump was a member of the West Virginia University Board of Governors in the early 1960s and was an alternate delegate to Democratic National Convention from West Virginia in 1952.  Governor Kump's law partner, Jack R. Nuzum, was the husband of Eldora Marie Bolyard Nuzum, the first female editor of a daily newspaper in West Virginia and noted journalist. Judge Jack R. Nuzum, mentored by former Governor Kump, later became Circuit Judge of Randolph County, West Virginia, and during his lifetime also served as a legislator from Taylor and Randolph counties.

Historic Kump Home

The home of the 19th Governor of West Virginia on Randolph Avenue in Elkins, West Virginia, is a landmark in the town known as the Kump Home. The brick home stands stately reminding citizens of an era in the town's history.

Work as Governor

Herman Guy Kump focused upon public education, rights of property owners as related to taxation, and public welfare during his tenure as Governor of West Virginia. While Kump was Governor of West Virginia, new state programs were developed such as the state road administration, state park and forestry projects, state-run public assistance programming, and a county school system. His positions were moderate and he encouraged local control where possible. Governor Kump served West Virginia during demanding economic times and some of the programs developed during his tenure are still operational. Governor Herman G. Kump is buried in the Beverly Cemetery in Randolph County, West Virginia.

References

External links
 Herman Guy Kump at The West Virginia Encyclopedia
 Inaugural Address of Herman G. Kump
 Gov. Herman Guy Kump at National Governors Association
 

1877 births
1962 deaths
20th-century American lawyers
20th-century American politicians
American bank presidents
American judges
American Presbyterians
Burials in West Virginia
County prosecuting attorneys in West Virginia
Democratic Party governors of West Virginia
Farmers from West Virginia
United States Army Judge Advocate General's Corps
Mayors of places in West Virginia
Military personnel from West Virginia
People from Elkins, West Virginia
People from Hampshire County, West Virginia
United States Army officers
United States Army personnel of World War I
University of Virginia alumni
West Virginia circuit court judges
West Virginia lawyers